John Stephen "Steve" Leehane (20 October 1891 – 4 April 1972) was an Australian rules footballer who played with Carlton in the Victorian Football League (VFL).

A defender, Leehane was recruited from Cheltenham and played finals football in five of his six league seasons. He missed the 1915 finals series with a groin injury and missed out on playing in back to back premierships, having been a half back flanker in Carlton's 1914 premiership team. Leehane was a full-back in the 1916 VFL Grand Final, which Carlton lost to Fitzroy.

He had two sons, Ted and Tom, who also had VFL careers.

References

1891 births
1972 deaths
Australian rules footballers from Victoria (Australia)
Australian Rules footballers: place kick exponents
Carlton Football Club players
Carlton Football Club Premiership players
One-time VFL/AFL Premiership players